Margaret Wake may refer to:

Margaret Wake, 3rd Baroness Wake of Liddell (c. 1297 – 1349), English noblewoman of the 14th century
Margaret Wake, wife of William Tryon, after whom Wake County, North Carolina, is named